The Mercury Men is a 2011 series of web shorts produced for the Syfy network by writer/director Christopher Preksta.  It is shot in a retro, 1950s style, in black and white (stock photos of Apollo are in color). Though it is set in the mid-1970s, shortly after the Apollo moon landings.  The first episode is set explicitly in 1975 and the following eight episodes take place on the same night.  The tenth episode is stated as taking place in 1976, but the month and day are unspecified, so it is not clear exactly how much time has lapsed between the ninth and tenth episodes, though it must be significant, as the protagonist somehow travels from Earth to Mercury in that time.  Each episode is between 6 and 9 minutes long.  The show follows the adventures of a mild-mannered office worker, Edward Borman (Mark Tierno) who is drawn into an adventure when his building is attacked by men from the planet Mercury, who appear to be made of pure light.  Their plan is to use the steel framework of the building to enhance their gravity device which will pull down the Moon into the Earth.  He meets Jack Yaeger (Curt Wootton), a member of a secretive group of defenders known as The League.  It was shot in Pittsburgh, Pennsylvania, on a budget of under $10,000.

Cast
Mark Tierno as Edward Borman
Curt Wootton as Jack Yaeger
Amy Staggs as Grace

Episodes

References

External links
mercuryseries.com - The show's official website
mercurymenpictures.com - The producers' website
syfy.com/mercurymen - Syfy's page on the show

Syfy original films
American science fiction web series
2011 television specials
Retrofuturism